Durringtonia is a monotypic genus of flowering plants in the family Rubiaceae. The genus contains only one species, viz. Durringtonia paludosa, which is endemic to Australia (southeastern New South Wales and northeastern Queensland).

References

External links
Durringtonia in the World Checklist of Rubiaceae

Monotypic Rubiaceae genera
Anthospermeae